A downhole heat exchanger, (DHE) also called a borehole heat exchanger, (BHE) is a heat exchanger installed inside a vertical or inclined borehole. It is used to capture or dissipate heat to or from the ground. DHT's are used for geothermal heating, sometimes with the help of a geothermal heat pump. Downhole heat exchangers, like other use of geothermal energy, have the potential to significantly contribute to the reduction of  emissions. In northern Europe, DHE are already widely deployed.

Types

U-tube
The heat exchanger usually consists of one or two u-tubes through which the carrier fluid, usually water, circulates. The space around the u-tubes is filled with groundwater or backfilled with thermally conductive grout.

Open pipe
Another design uses a single open pipe to flow water downward. The water then returns through the annular gap between the pipe and the casing. This design provides better thermal contact than u-tubes, but risks contamination by groundwater. Since this involves practically no downhole equipment, these systems usually only go by the name of borehole heat exchangers (BHT).

Standing column well
If no casing is installed and groundwater is permitted to charge the system, this arrangement is no longer a BHT, but rather a standing column well.

External links 
 Video documentation: Installation of a downhole heat exchanger
John W. Lund: The use of downhole heat exchangers (2003)

References

Heat exchangers